William Hickling was an English footballer who played in the Football League for Derby County, and Middlesbrough.

References

English footballers
Association football defenders
English Football League players
Derby County F.C. players
Tottenham Hotspur F.C. players
Middlesbrough F.C. players
Ilkeston United F.C. players